Grachi is a rural locality (a khutor) in Aleksikovskoye Rural Settlement, Novonikolayevsky District, Volgograd Oblast, Russia. The population was 376 as of 2010. There are 18 streets.

Geography 
Grachi is located in steppe, on the Khopyorsko-Buzulukskaya Plain, 13 km southwest of Novonikolayevsky (the district's administrative centre) by road. Aleksikovsky is the nearest rural locality.

References 

Rural localities in Novonikolayevsky District